Artur Wojciech Zawisza (born 30 March 1969) is a Polish politician. He is a member of the Libertas Poland party, of which he is the vice-president.

He was born in Lublin, Poland, and graduated in literature and philosophy from the Catholic University of Lublin. In the 1980s he was a member of the underground anti-communist Catholic Scouting Organization "Zawisza" . After finishing his studies he assisted Marek Jurek, a Member of the National Broadcasting Council. In 1997 he was editor-in-chief of a nationwide daily newspaper "Nasz Dziennik". Later in 1997 he became Chief of the Cabinet of the Chief of the Chancellery of the Prime Minister of Poland. From 1998 to 2000 he was secretary general of the Zjednoczenie Chrześcijańsko-Narodowe (National-Christian Union). In 2001 he was one of the founders of Przymierze Prawicy (Alliance of Right). Alliance of Right united with Law and Justice in 2002.

He has been a member of the Sejm since 2001. He works in the Economy Committee and Public Finance Committee in the Polish Parliament. He is the President of the Polish-Irish Interparliamentary Group and Vice President of the Parliamentary Caucus for Defence of the Rights of the Family. He was re-elected in  2005. From 2013 to 2017 he was one of the leaders of National Movement.

He has been married since 1995 and has two daughters and a son.

References

1969 births
Living people
Politicians from Lublin
John Paul II Catholic University of Lublin alumni
Members of the Polish Sejm 2001–2005
Members of the Polish Sejm 2005–2007
Right Wing of the Republic politicians
Polish Roman Catholics